The 2020–21 Troy Trojans women's basketball team represented Troy University during the 2020–21 NCAA Division I women's basketball season. The basketball team, led by ninth-year head coach Chanda Rigby, played all home games at the Trojan Arena along with the Troy Trojans men's basketball team. They were members of the Sun Belt Conference.

As East Division champs, the Trojans entered the Sun Belt Tournament as the No. 1 seed from the East. Defeating Louisiana in the finals of the tournament, the Trojans captured their first Sun Belt Tournament title since 2017.

Previous season 
The Trojans finished the 2019–20 season 25–4, 16–2 in Sun Belt play to finish conference regular season champions. They made it to the 2019-20 Sun Belt Conference women's basketball tournament where they received a first round bye and were scheduled to play Louisiana in the Quarterfinals. However, before the game could commence, the remainder of the tournament as well as all postseason play was cancelled due to the COVID-19 pandemic.

Offseason

Departures

Transfers

Recruiting

Roster

Schedule and results

|-
!colspan=9 style=| Non-conference Regular Season
|-

|-
!colspan=9 style=| Conference regular season
|-

|-
!colspan=9 style=| Sun Belt Tournament

|-
!colspan=9 style=| NCAA tournament

See also
 2020–21 Troy Trojans men's basketball team

References

Troy Trojans women's basketball seasons
Troy Trojans
Troy Trojans women's basketball
Troy Trojans women's basketball
Troy